Millaray is a feminine given name of Mapuche origin.  It means "golden flower" (from milla "gold" and rayen "flower").  As of 2010, it was the 49th most popular name in Chile. The Chilean actress Millaray Viera is one example of a person named Millaray.

References

Mapuche
Mapuche women
Spanish feminine given names
Mapuche given names
Feminine given names